Stiphrometasia pharaonalis is a moth in the family Crambidae. It is found in Egypt.

References

Cybalomiinae
Moths described in 1916